Battle Lake is a lake in Alberta, Canada. A locality by the same name is located just east of the lake. Battle River originates in the lake.

See also 
List of lakes in Alberta

References 

Lakes of Alberta
County of Wetaskiwin No. 10